Richard Stephens may refer to:
Richard Stephens (figure skater) (born 1947), Canadian figure skater
Richard Stephens of Eastington (died 1599), English lawyer and Member of Parliament
Richard Stephens (burgess) (1585–1636), burgess of the Jamestown Settlement
Richard Stephens (judge) (c. 1630–1692), Irish barrister, politician and judge
Richard Stephens (pioneer) (1755–1831), American Revolutionary War soldier, politician and slave-plantation owner
Richard Stephens, member of The String-A-Longs

See also

Richard Stevens (disambiguation)
Richie Stephens (Richard Stephenson, born 1966), Jamaican singer and producer
Stephens (surname)